Saigon Love Story is  Vietnam's first movie musical filmed entirely on location in Vietnam including Saigon and Phan Thiet. One of the first films independently produced outside of the Communist controlled film industry, overseas Vietnamese director Ringo Le decided to return to his birthplace to shoot his first feature film project.  "Saigon Love Story" had a screening at VC FilmFest 2006. The film was an official selection into the Panorama selection at the Shanghai International Film Festival 2006 and was nominated for the "Winds of Asia-Best New Film Award" at the Tokyo International Film Festival 2006.  The film traveled throughout the United States in sold-out roadshow tours to help bring attention to Vietnamese films and artists, but which also created political controversy. It was released on Valentine's Day in 2008 across Vietnam.

Plot
Set in Vietnam during the 1980s, Danh is a young boy growing up in Saigon. Though he should help his mother to sell noodles from a cart out of their home, he often sneaks out to buy cassettes.

One day, he inadvertently stumbles into a mysterious beautiful street vendor named Tam, selling her cassette, Saigon Love Story. Intrigued about her music, Danh decides to buy the cassette, only to discover that it is blank. When Danh confronts Tam, he finds that she is penniless and unable to repay him, so she serenades him a song in her cassette. Enchanted, Danh finds a voice that has long been suppressed, a voice that is the ticket out of their impoverished life.

References

External links
 

2006 films
Vietnamese musical films
Films set in the 1980s
2000s musical films